Bentley's Oyster Bar and Grill is a restaurant at 11-15 Swallow Street, London, which opened in 1916. The restaurant, previously known as Bentley's, has always specialised in oysters.

History 
Bentley's was owned for some years by Oscar Owide, "once one of London's favourites but in Owide's ownership, a rather shabby place". Owide still owned it in 2004. It was purchased by the chef Richard Corrigan in 2005.

See also
 List of seafood restaurants

References

Restaurants in London
Seafood restaurants
Oyster bars